Moral nihilism (also known as ethical nihilism) is the meta-ethical view that nothing is objectively morally right or morally wrong.

Moral nihilism is distinct from moral relativism, which allows for actions to be wrong relative to a particular culture or individual. It is also distinct from expressivism, according to which when we make moral claims, "We are not making an effort to describe the way the world is ... we are venting our emotions, commanding others to act in certain ways, or revealing a plan of action".

Moral nihilism today broadly tends to take the form of an Error Theory: The view developed originally by J.L. Mackie in his 1977 book Ethics: Inventing Right and Wrong. Error theory and nihilism broadly take the form of a negative claim about the existence of objective values or properties. Under traditional views there are moral properties or methods which hold objectively in some sense beyond our contingent interests which morally obligate us to act. For Mackie and the Error Theorists, such properties do not exist in the world, and therefore morality conceived of by reference to objective facts must also not exist. Therefore, morality in the traditional sense does not exist.

However, holding nihilism does not necessarily imply that we should give up using moral or ethical language; some nihilists contend that it remains a useful tool. In fact Mackie and other contemporary defenders of Error Theory, such as Richard Joyce, defend the use of moral or ethical talk and action even in knowledge of their fundamental falsity. The legitimacy of this activity however is questionable and is a subject of great debate in philosophy at the moment.

Forms of nihilism
Moral nihilists agree that all claims such as 'murder is morally wrong' are not true. But different nihilistic views differ in two ways.

Some may say that such claims are neither true nor false; others say that they are all false.

Nihilists differ in the scope of their theories. Error theorists typically claim that it is only distinctively moral claims which are false; practical nihilists claim that there are no reasons for action of any kind; some nihilists extend this claim to include reasons for belief.

Ethical language: false versus not truth-apt 
J. L. Mackie argues that moral assertions are only true if there are moral properties, but because there are none, all such claims are false. Under such a view moral propositions which express beliefs are then systematically in error. For under Mackie's view, if there are to be moral properties, they must be objective and therefore not amenable to differences in subjective desires and preferences. Moreover any claims that these moral properties, if they did exist would need to be intrinsically motivating by being in some primitive relation to our consciousness. They must be able of guiding us morally just by the fact of being in some clear awareness of their truth. But this is not the case, and such ideas in his views are plainly queer.

Other versions of the theory claim that moral assertions are not true because they are neither true nor false. This form of moral nihilism claims that moral beliefs and assertions presuppose the existence of moral facts that do not exist. Consider, for example, the claim that the present king of France is bald. Some argue that this claim is neither true nor false because it presupposes that there is currently a king of France, but there is not. The claim suffers from "presupposition failure". Richard Joyce argues for this form of moral nihilism under the name "fictionalism".

The scope question
Error theory is built on three principles:

 There are no moral features in this world; nothing is right or wrong.
 Therefore, no moral judgments are true. 
 However, our sincere moral judgments try, but always fail, to describe the moral features of things.

Thus, we always lapse into error when thinking in moral terms. We are trying to state the truth when we make moral judgments. But since there is no moral truth, all of our moral claims are mistaken. Hence the error. These three principles lead to the conclusion that there is no moral knowledge. Knowledge requires truth. If there is no moral truth, there can be no moral knowledge. Thus moral values are purely chimerical.

Arguments for nihilism

Argument from queerness 
The most prominent argument for nihilism is the argument from queerness.

J. L. Mackie argues that there are no objective ethical values, by arguing that they would be queer (strange):If there were objective values, then they would be entities or qualities or relations of a very strange sort, utterly different from anything else in the universe.

For all those who also find such entities queer (prima facie implausible), there is reason to doubt the existence of objective values.

In his book Morality without Foundations: A Defense of Ethical Contextualism (1999), Mark Timmons provides a reconstruction of Mackie's views in the form of the two related arguments. These are based on the rejection of properties, facts, and relationships that do not fit within the worldview of philosophical naturalism, the idea "that everything—including any particular events, facts, properties, and so on—is part of the natural physical world that science investigates" (1999, p. 12). Timmons adds, "The undeniable attraction of this outlook in contemporary philosophy no doubt stems from the rise of modern science and the belief that science is our best avenue for discovering the nature of reality".

There are several ways in which moral properties are supposedly queer:
 our ordinary moral discourse purports to refer to intrinsically prescriptive properties and facts "that would somehow motivate us or provide us with reasons for action independent of our desires and aversions"—but such properties and facts do not comport with philosophical naturalism.
 given that objective moral properties supposedly supervene upon natural properties (such as biological or psychological properties), the relation between the moral properties and the natural properties is metaphysically mysterious and does not comport with philosophical naturalism.
 a moral realist who countenances the existence of metaphysically queer properties, facts, and relations must also posit some special faculty by which we have knowledge of them.

Responses and criticisms 
Christine Korsgaard responds to Mackie by saying:

Other criticisms of the argument include noting that the very fact that such entities would have to be something fundamentally different from what we normally experience, therefore assumably outside our sphere of experience, we cannot prima facie have reason to either doubt or affirm their existence. Therefore if one had independent grounds for supposing such things to exist (such as a reductio ad absurdum of the contrary) the argument from queerness cannot give one any particular reason to think otherwise. An argument along these lines has been provided by e.g. Akeel Bilgrami.

Argument from explanatory impotence 
Gilbert Harman argued that we do not need to posit the existence of objective values in order to explain our 'moral observations'.

See also

Citations

Bibliography

 

 
 

 .

Further reading
 Garner, Richard T.; Bernard Rosen (1967). Moral Philosophy: A Systematic Introduction to Normative Ethics and Meta-ethics, New York: Macmillan.
 Garner, Richard T.; (1994). Beyond Morality. Temple University Press.
 Shafer-Landau, Russ (2003). Whatever Happened to Good and Evil?, Oxford University Press.
 Shafer-Landau, Russ & Terence Cuneo (eds.) (2007). Foundations of Ethics, Blackwell Publishing Ltd.
 Sinnott-Armstrong, Walter (2006a). "Moral Skepticism," The Stanford Encyclopedia of Philosophy, Edward N. Zalta (ed.). (link)
 Sinnott-Armstrong, Walter (2006b). Moral Skepticisms, Oxford University Press.
 van Roojen, Mark (2004). "Moral Cognitivism vs. Non-Cognitivism," The Stanford Encyclopedia of Philosophy, Edward N. Zalta (ed.). (link)

About the queerness argument
 Brink, David O. (1984). "Moral Realism and the Sceptical Arguments from Disagreement and Queerness", Australasian Journal of Philosophy 62(2): 111–125.
 Garner, Richard T. (1990). "On the Genuine Queerness of Moral Properties and Facts", Australasian Journal of Philosophy 68(2): 137–46.
 Mackie, J. L. (1946). "A Refutation of Morals", Australasian Journal of Psychology and Philosophy 24: 77–90. 
 Rosati, Connie S. (2006). "Moral Motivation", The Stanford Encyclopedia of Philosophy, Edward N. Zalta (ed.).
 Shepski, Lee (2008). "The Vanishing Argument from Queerness", Australasian Journal of Philosophy 86(3): 371–87.

Amorality
Meta-ethics
Nihilism
Nihilism